The Kerala State Film Award – Special Mention is an award presented at the Kerala State Film Awards of India.

Recipients

See also 
 Kerala State Film Award – Special Jury Award

References

External links 
Official website
PRD, Govt. of Kerala: Awardees List

Kerala State Film Awards